Nigel Paul Taylor (born 1956) is a British botanist. He mainly focuses on the study of cacti. Taylor has been director of the Singapore Botanic Gardens since September 2011. He was previously curator of the Kew Gardens in London.

References

External links

1956 births
Living people
Date of birth missing (living people)
Place of birth missing (living people)
British botanists